Jérôme Jeannet (born 26 January 1977 in Fort-de-France, Martinique) is a French épée fencer.

His brother, Fabrice Jeannet is a fencer also.

Record against selected opponents
Includes results from all competitions 2006–present and major competitions from pre - 2006. The list includes athletes who have reached the quarterfinals at the World Championships or Olympic Games, plus those who have earned medals in major team competitions.

  Anton Avdeev 1-0
  Érik Boisse 1-2
  Stefano Carozzo 2-1
  Dmytro Chumak 2-0
  Diego Confalonieri 1-1
  Géza Imre 1-1
  Maksym Khvorost 2-0
  Tomasz Motyka 2-1
  Bogdan Nikishin 0-1
  Ulrich Robeiri 1-2
  Matteo Tagliariol 2-1
  Vitali Zakhrov 1-0
  Radosław Zawrotniak 1-0
  Fabrice Jeannet 1-1
  Pavel Kolobkov 0-1
  Guillermo Madrigal Sardinas 1-0
  Alfredo Rota 1-1
  Sven Järve 0-1
  Alexandru Nyisztor 1-0
  Bas Verwijlen 1-0
  Juan Castañeda Cortes 1-0
  Yin Lian Chi 1-0
  Nikolai Novosjolov 1-1
  Jose Luis Abajo 0-1
  Robert Andrzejuk 1-1

References

1977 births
Living people
Sportspeople from Fort-de-France
Martiniquais fencers
French male épée fencers
Fencers at the 2004 Summer Olympics
Fencers at the 2008 Summer Olympics
Olympic fencers of France
Olympic gold medalists for France
French people of Martiniquais descent
Olympic medalists in fencing
Medalists at the 2008 Summer Olympics
Officers of the Ordre national du Mérite
Medalists at the 2004 Summer Olympics
21st-century French people